The Wohl degradation in carbohydrate chemistry is a chain contraction method for aldoses. The classic example is the conversion of glucose to arabinose as shown below. The reaction is named after the German chemist Alfred Wohl (1863–1939).

In one modification, d-glucose is converted to the glucose oxime by reaction with hydroxylamine and sodium methoxide. In this reaction step the oxime is converted into the nitrile with simultaneous conversion of all the alcohol groups to acetate groups. 

In the final step sodium methoxide in methanol is added, leading to removal of all the acetate groups and ejection of the nitrile group and collapse of the second carbon from a tetrahedral structure to an aldehyde.

Ruff–Fenton degradation 
In a variation, the Ruff–Fenton degradation (Otto Ruff 1898, H.J.H. Fenton 1893) converts the aldose first to the alpha-hydroxy-carboxylic acid with bromine and calcium hydroxide and then to the shortened aldose by reaction with Iron(III) sulfate and hydrogen peroxide.

See also
Nef reaction

References

Carbohydrate chemistry
Elimination reactions
Degradation reactions
Name reactions